Acanthotrophon is a genus of sea snails, marine gastropod mollusks in the family Muricidae, the murex snails or rock snails.

Species
Species within the genus Acanthotrophon include:
 † Acanthotrophon aquensis Lozouet, 1999 †
 Acanthotrophon carduus (Broderip, 1833)
 Acanthotrophon latispinosus Garrigues & Lamy, 2019
 Acanthotrophon sentus Berry, 1969
 Acanthotrophon sorenseni (Hertlein & Strong, 1951)
 Acanthotrophon striatoides Vokes, 1980

References

External links
 L. G.; Strong, A. M. (1951). Eastern Pacific expeditions of the New York Zoological Society. XLIII. Mollusks from the west coast of Mexico and Central America. Part X. Zoologica. 36(2): 67-120, 11 pls
 Vokes E.H. (1980). Review of the muricid genus Acanthotrophon (Mollusca: Gastropoda). The Veliger. 23: 10-14, 2 pls

Muricopsinae